McKinley Bailey (born November 12, 1980)  is the Iowa State Representative from the 9th District. He has served in the Iowa House of Representatives since 2007.

Bailey currently serves on several committees in the Iowa House - the Commerce committee; the Economic Growth committee; the Natural Resources committee; the Veterans Affairs committee.  He also serves as vice-chair of the Agriculture and Natural Resources Appropriations Subcommittee.

Bailey was elected in 2006 with 5,685 votes (55%), defeating Republican opponent George S. Eichhorn.

Early life and education
Bailey was raised in Webster City, Iowa. He obtained his A.A with an emphasis in Spanish from Methodist College in Fayetteville, North Carolina. He later received his B.A in international studies with a concentration in international business from the University of Iowa. He began studying for his master's degree in Public Administration in 2007 at Iowa State University.

Career
Prior to becoming a state representative, Bailey served in the US Army in Afghanistan and Iraq.

Organizations
Bailey is a member of the following organizations:
Hamilton County League of Women Voters
VFW
American Legion
Disabled American Veterans
University of Iowa Veterans Association (Founder and past president)

References

External links
Representative McKinley Bailey official Iowa General Assembly site
State Representative McKinley Bailey official constituency site
 

1980 births
Living people
Democratic Party members of the Iowa House of Representatives
Politicians from Ames, Iowa
People from Webster City, Iowa
University of Iowa alumni